Non Nước may refer to:
Non Nước Village, marble cutter village and caves near the beach in Da Nang.
Non Nước Beach, large white sandy beach in Đà Nẵng
Non Nước Pagoda (Hanoi), at Sóc Sơn, Hanoi
Non Nước Hill, river-island in Ninh Bình
Non Nước Pagoda (Ninh Bình), on the hill in the river
Non Nước Bridge, new concrete bridge over the River Đáy